Andrew Napier was born and raised in Wisconsin and attended the University of Wisconsin–Madison.

In 2009, after working on Quentin Tarantino's Inglourious Basterds in Berlin, Germany, he moved to Los Angeles. Andrew was a producer of the 2013 Academy Award®- winning short film Curfew, and later edited its feature adaptation Before I Disappear (SXSW 2014 Audience Award Winner).

His screenplay for Dogtooth, a remake of the Academy Award®-nominated Greek foreign film, is in development at Mandalay Pictures. Andrew directed the feature documentary Mad As Hell (Hot Docs 2014 Conscious Media Award Winner), which follows Cenk Uygur, whose online news show The Young Turks has amassed over two billion views on YouTube. He also directed the narrative short Grandma's Not A Toaster (Tribeca 2013) and the feature documentary Mary and Bill (Wisconsin Film Festival 2011 Best Documentary). Andrew produced and edited The Past is a Grotesque Animal (2014), a documentary about the band "of Montreal," released by Oscilloscope Laboratories, and "Bounce: How the Ball Taught the World to Play." Napier co-produced the romantic comedy Lust For Love (2014), starring Fran Kranz and Dichen Lachman. He served as an executive producer for the documentary The Culture High, and the dark comedies The Lord of Catan starring Amy Acker, and "Limbo" starring H. Jon Benjamin.

References

External links

Living people
People from Wisconsin
University of Wisconsin–Madison alumni
American film producers
American film directors
American screenwriters
American television directors
Year of birth missing (living people)